Grouse Creek (also Cookesville) is an unincorporated community in the nearly unpopulated northwestern region of Box Elder County, Utah, United States, near the Idaho and Nevada borders. The community lies along unpaved roads north of State Route 30 in the Grouse Creek Mountains.  Its elevation is 5,331 feet (1,625 m).  It has a post office with the ZIP code 84313.

History
Grouse Creek was first settled in 1876. The community took its name from a nearby creek of the same name where grouse were abundant.

Climate
According to the Köppen Climate Classification system, Grouse Creek has a semi-arid climate, abbreviated "BSk" on climate maps.

Demographics

See also

References

External links

 Grouse Creek Country Club Unofficial community website

Populated places established in 1876
Unincorporated communities in Box Elder County, Utah
Unincorporated communities in Utah
1876 establishments in Utah Territory